Hermenegildo Galeana (1762–1814) was a hero of the Mexican War of Independence.

Hermenegildo Galeana may also refer to:
Hermenegildo Galeana, Chihuahua, a town named in his honour
Hermenegildo Galeana, Puebla, a municipality
ARM Hermenegildo Galeana, two vessels of the Mexican Navy

See also
Galeana (disambiguation)